Francisco de Paula (1914–1985) was an Argentine film actor. He appeared in more than thirty films during his career including The Story of a Bad Woman.

Selected filmography
 24 Hours in the Life of a Woman (1944)
 Wake Up to Life (1945)
 El Capitán Pérez (1946)
 Story of a Bad Woman (1948) 
 Passport to Rio (1948)
 The Earring (1951)
 Rebeldía (1975)

References

Bibliography 
 Goble, Alan. The Complete Index to Literary Sources in Film. Walter de Gruyter, 1999.

External links 
 

1914 births
1985 deaths
Argentine male film actors
People from Córdoba Province, Argentina
20th-century Argentine male actors